Pedro Quintas (born 13 May 2002) is a Brazilian skateboarder. He has competed in men's park events at several World Skate Championships, finishing 16th in 2018 and taking bronze in 2019.

He competed in the men's park event at the 2021 Tokyo Olympics.

References 

Living people
2002 births
Olympic skateboarders of Brazil
Brazilian skateboarders
Skateboarders at the 2020 Summer Olympics
Sportspeople from São Paulo
World Skateboarding Championship medalists